Drinking games are games which involve the consumption of alcoholic beverages and often enduring the subsequent intoxication resulting from them. Evidence of the existence of drinking games dates back to antiquity. Drinking games have been banned at some institutions, particularly colleges and universities.

History

Ancient Greece

Kottabos is one of the earliest known drinking games from ancient Greece, dated to the 5th to 4th centuries BC. Players would use dregs (remnants of what was left in their cup) to hit targets across the room with their wine. Often, there were special prizes and penalties for one's performance in the game.

Ancient China
Drinking games were enjoyed in ancient China, usually incorporating the use of dice or verbal exchange of riddles. During the Tang Dynasty (618-907), the Chinese used a silver canister where written lots could be drawn that designated which player had to drink and specifically how much; for example, from 1, 5, 7, or 10 measures of drink that the youngest player, or the last player to join the game, or the most talkative player, or the host, or the player with the greatest alcohol tolerance, etc. had to drink. There were even drinking game referee officials, including a 'registrar of the rules' who knew all the rules to the game, a 'registrar of the horn' who tossed a silver flag down on calling out second offenses, and a 'governor' who decided one's third call of offense. These referees were used mainly for maintaining order (as drinking games often became rowdy) and for reviewing faults that could be punished with a player drinking a penalty cup. If a guest was considered a 'coward' for dropping out of the game, he could be branded as a 'deserter' and not invited back to further drinking bouts. There was another game where little puppets and dolls dressed as western foreigners with blue eyes (Iranian peoples) were set up and when one fell over, the person it pointed to had to empty his cup of wine.

Germany 

Drinking games in 19th century Germany included Bierskat, Elfern, Rammes and Quodlibet, as well as Schlauch and Laubober, probably the same game as Grasobern. But the "crown of all drinking games" was one with an ancient and distinctive name: Cerevis. One feature of the game was that everything went under a different name from normal. So the cards (Karten) were called 'spoons' (Löffel), the Sevens were 'Septembers' and the Aces were the 'Juveniles' (junge Leichtsinn). A player who used the normal names was penalised. Everytime a card was played, it was supposed to be accompanied by humorous words, so if a Jack or Unter was played, the player might say something like "my merry Unterkasser" (Lustig mein Unterkasser) or "long live my Unterkasser" (Vivat mein Unterkasser). If his opponent beat it, he might say "hang the Unterkasser" (Hängt den Unterkasser). The loser had to chalk up a figure such as a swallow, a wheel or a pair of scissors depending on the number of minus points gained and was only allowed to erase them once he had drunk the associated amount of beer.

Silver wager cups, originally used during 16th century German wedding feasts, are used in dexterity drinking games. Players fill both the large cup and the smaller cup that swings beneath it, and must drink from the former without spilling the latter.

Types

Endurance
The simplest drinking games are endurance games in which players compete to out-drink one another. Players take turns taking shots, and the last person standing is the winner. Some games have rules involving the "cascade", "fountain", or "waterfall", which encourages each player to drink constantly from their cup so long as the player before him does not stop drinking. Such games can also favor speed over quantity, in which players race to drink a case of beer the fastest. Often drinking large amounts will be combined with a stylistic element or an abnormal method of drinking, as with the boot of beer, yard of ale, or a keg stand.

Tolerance games are simply about seeing which player can last the longest. It can be as simple as two people matching each other drink for drink until one of the participants "passes out". Power hour and its variant, centurion, fall under this category.

Speed

Many pub or bar games involve competitive drinking for speed. Examples of such drinking games are Edward Fortyhands, boat races, beer bonging, shotgunning, flippy cup (a team-based speed game), and yard. Some say that the most important skill to improving speed is to relax and take fewer but larger gulps. There are a variety of individual tactics to accomplishing this, such as bending the knees in anticipation, or when drinking from a plastic cup, squeezing the sides of the cup to form a more perfect funnel.

Athletic races involving alcohol including the beer mile, which consists of a mile run with a can of beer consumed before each of the four laps. A variant is known in German speaking countries as Bierkastenlauf (beer crate running) where a team of two carries a crate of beer along a route of several kilometers and must consume all of the bottles prior to crossing the finish line.

Skill
Some party and pub games focus on the performance of a particular act of skill, rather than on either the amount a participant drinks or the speed with which they do so. Examples include beer pong, quarters, chandeliers (also known as gauchoball, rage cage, stack cup), caps, polish horseshoes, pong, baseball, and beer darts.

Pub golf involves orienteering and pub crawling together.

A unique drinking game is made in the tavern Oepfelchammer in Zürich, Switzerland. It is called "Balkenprobe" and one has therefore to climb up a beam at the ceiling and move to another beam and then to drink a glass of wine with the head hanging down.

Thinking
Thinking games rely on the players' powers of observation, recollection, logic and articulation.

Numerous types of thinking games exist, including Think or Drink, 21, beer checkers, bizz buzz, buffalo, saved by the bell, bullshit, tourettes, matchboxes, never have I ever, roman numerals, fuzzy duck, pennying, wine games, and Zoom Schwartz Profigliano. Trivia games, such as Trivial Pursuit, are sometimes played as drinking games.

Card and dice

Drinking games involving cards include president, horserace, Kings, liar's poker, pyramid, ring of fire, toepen, ride the bus and black or red.

Dice games include beer die, dudo, kinito, liar's dice, Mexico, mia, ship, captain, and crew, three man, and Triple Snakes.

Arts
Movie drinking games are played while watching a movie (sometimes a TV show or a sporting event) and have a set of rules for who drinks when and how much based on on-screen events and dialogue. The rules may be the same for all players, or alternatively players may each be assigned rules related to particular characters. The rules are designed so that rarer events require larger drinks. Rule sets for such games are usually arbitrary and local, although they are sometimes published by fan clubs.

In reference to film, a popular game among young adults consists of printing out a mustache and taping it on the television screen. Every time the mustache fits appropriately to a person on the screen, one must drink the designated amount.

Live drinking games such as Los Angeles-based "A Drinking Game" involve recreating films of the 80s in a "Rocky Horror" fashion, with gift bags, drinking cues, and costumed actors. A suggestion to "do six shots for SEAL Team 6" following every mention of Osama bin Laden at the 2012 Democratic National Convention necessitated a prominent disclaimer on the satire site that posted it, as the quantity of alcohol ingested would probably have been lethal.

"Datsyuk Game" involves a Datsyuk highlight reel being played and contestants drink every time the word Datsyuk is mentioned. The ceremonial playing of the Russian national anthem before the game is another tradition.

Music can also be used as a basis for drinking games. The song "Thunderstruck" by AC/DC is used in which a player begins drinking when the word thunder is sung and switches to the next player the next time it is sung.

Sport related drinking games involve the participants each selecting a scenario of the game resulting in their drink being downed. Examples of this include participants each picking a footballer in a game while other versions require multiple players to be selected. Should a player score or be sent off, a drink must be taken. Another version requires a drink for every touch a player takes of the ball.

Hybrid games
Some drinking games can fall into multiple categories such as a Power hour which is a primarily an endurance-based game, but can also incorporate the arts if players are prompted to drink by a playlist that changes songs every 60 seconds. Similarly, Flip cup combines the skill of flipping cups with the speed of drinking quickly prior to flipping.

Mobile app games 
Many drinking game apps (i.e. Boom Phone, Picolo and Appyshot) have been launched on mobile devices, Android, iOS, and Windows Phone.

See also

 Binge drinking
 Pregaming
 List of drinking games
 List of public house topics
 Beerfest

References

Literature

External links

 
Large List of Movie Drinking Games